Jan Marcus Zwaan (25 August 1925 – 21 September 2007) was a Dutch sprinter. He competed at the 1948 Summer Olympics in the 110 m hurdles events, but failed to reach the finals.

His brother Jo was also an Olympic sprinter; he took part in the 100 m and 4 × 100 m events at the 1948 Games.

References

1925 births
2007 deaths
Dutch male sprinters
Athletes (track and field) at the 1948 Summer Olympics
Olympic athletes of the Netherlands
Athletes from Amsterdam